The 1906–07 Rugby Union County Championship was the 19th edition of England's premier rugby union club competition at the time.  

Devon and Durham won the competition after being declared joint champions following two drawn matches. It was Durham's fifth success and Devon's fourth.    It was Durham's eighth consecutive final appearance. In the final S P Start scored an injury time try for Devon to force a replay.

Final

Final replay

See also
 English rugby union system
 Rugby union in England

References

Rugby Union County Championship
County Championship (rugby union) seasons